George William Andrews (September 9, 1869 in Stanton Harcourt, Oxfordshire, England, United Kingdom – November 5, 1943) was a Canadian politician and real estate agent. He served as Winnipeg MP from 1917 to 1921.

He was elected as a Liberal Unionist to the House of Commons of Canada in 1917 to represent the riding of Winnipeg Centre. He became an independent on June 2, 1919 when he withdrew from the Unionist government due to its handling of he Winnipeg General strike. He was defeated in the 1921 election.

During World War I, he served overseas as a major for the 90th Rifles.

Electoral history

References

External links 
 

1869 births
1943 deaths
English emigrants to Canada
Independent candidates in the 1921 Canadian federal election
Liberal Party of Canada MPs
Members of the House of Commons of Canada from Manitoba
Place of birth missing